The Irish Exhibition of Living Art (IELA) was a yearly exhibition of Irish abstract expressionism and avant-garde Irish art that was started in 1943 by Mainie Jellett.

Background

World War II Ireland 
During World War II, Ireland remained neutral. The period was known as "the Emergency" in Ireland.  In line with its neutral stance in the war, Ireland did not engage directly in the war and declined to make any kind of allegiance to the Axis or Allied powers.  As a result, Ireland experienced a period of isolation from the rest of the Western world, with few Irish people travelling abroad and few foreigners travelling to Ireland.  Neutrality to the war set in motion a period of criticism and questioning of the fledgling country's national identity and ideals, with various factions unhappy with the status quo in the country.   Some of the primary concerns for those unsatisfied with the state of Ireland at the time included a government unconcerned with the republican ideals the nation was created with, widespread poverty in Ireland, and a general inability for the nation to be a major player on the world stage capable of defending itself. Rising prices have increased the difficulty of supply, hunger and fuel shortages. The shortage of sugar, soap, tea, paraffin, tobacco, meat, flour, bread and biscuits has prompted many people to move. With these concerns and isolation, many Irish people sought to question the direction the nation.  Irish artists in this war period and the time that immediately followed, also sought to question what constituted "Irish art" and how that would impact Irish identity.

Art In Ireland 
Art in Ireland during the 1930s and 1940s still primarily consisted of traditional representational art.  Championed by the Royal Hibernian Academy and the National College of Art, this traditionalist art remained the favoured style of visual artistic creation following the Emergency period. Many Irish artists rejected the established institutions and sought philosophical inspiration from other fields, particularly that of literature. Although it was not until the late 1930s that the character of Irish art was to be seriously challenged as Irish artists began seeking an Irish artistic identity.  With Mainie Jellett leading the way (and subsequently Norah McGuinness following Jellett's young death in 1944, soon after the first exhibition in 1943), the artists of Ireland found an outlet to challenge the traditionalist movements in Ireland through organisations like the IELA.

Prior to the opening of the IELA, one major exhibition took place each year in Dublin, which was the Annual Exhibition of the Royal Hibernian Academy.  The RHA, and other major art institutions in Ireland at this time, supported art that accurately portrayed reality. And while the established art forums favoured traditional representational art, there was some push back from groups of artists in favour of modernist art.  One of the most well-known of these prior to the IELA was known as the White Stag Group which was formed in the late 1930s.  The White Stag Group, formed by Kenneth Hall and Basil Rakoczi, had middle-class English roots that spread to Dublin and the rest of Ireland. The organisations of the IELA and White Stag Group are cited as responsible for non-traditional Irish art being displayed in a way that was accessible and popular.

History of the IELA 
The IELA was formed in 1943 after a group of artists in Ireland sought to oppose the traditional hegemony created by the Royal Hibernian Academy (RHA) and the National College of Art in Ireland.  Artists in this group included Norah McGuinness, Mainie Jellett, Evie Hone, Fr. Jack Hanlon, Hilary Heron and Louis le Brocquy, among others. While not all of them subscribed completely to the modernism of the rest of western Europe and the United States, these artists did seek to stray off the path established by Irish art institutions.  Many artists that founded the IELA were influenced by the dissenting Impressionist art circles in Paris who broke away from the French Academy.  Even though they understood this may cause friction with established institutions in Ireland, many of the founders saw the French as an example to be followed.  However, many artists managed to form a delicate balance, seeing as artists who displayed their work in the IELA also displayed pieces through the other traditional institutions such as the RHA.  Nonetheless, the IELA's main goal was to provide a forum for artists who sought to reshape the Irish artistic landscape and provided them the means through which to do that.

The beginnings of the IELA can be traced to an open criticism of the RHA by Jellett which ultimately led to other modernist artists like le Brocquy having their works rejected for exhibitions hosted annually by the RHA.  In response to this, Jellett and other modernist artists established the IELA to create a forum to display the work of artists regardless of what school or style they subscribed to.  Reviews of the IELA's first show in 1943 indicated the division in the art world over artistic identity and creativity. In some instances, this division was deeply entrenched, especially in the National College of Art, which was opposed to modernist movements for some time.  However, this opposition was not felt as strongly in every established institution in the country.  Even though steadfastness for traditional art was common, much of the art world in Ireland remained fairly well connected and eased their opposition to the tide of modernism coming from continent-inspired artists.  Both the modernist and traditionalist camps had their work displayed by the same institutions in some instances.  Ultimately, this coexistence allowed for institutions like IELA to be friendly with organisations such as the RHA, without which the IELA would have no traction in the Dublin art world.

Female artists played a critical role in the formation and establishment of the IELA.  The first two presidents of the Exhibition, Mainie Jellett and Norah McGuinness, were women who held the position during the formative years of the Exhibition.  Jellett, who served as the president before her death in 1944, played a key role in its formation, and McGuinness, who served for over 20 years after its foundation, played a critical role in maintaining the direction that the IELA stood for. In 1972, the original management stepped down and handed off the Exhibition to a younger generation of artists.

The IELA remains a showcase for contemporary art and has since expanded to include other art forms such as performance, video, and installation art.

References 

Art exhibitions in Ireland
1943 establishments in Ireland
Irish art
Art movements